The following is a list of events and releases that happened in 2017 in music in the United States.

Notable events

January
6 — Dropkick Murphys released their first album in four years, 11 Short Stories of Pain & Glory.
9 — Little Big Town performed the National Anthem at the third annual College Football Playoff National Championship at Raymond James Stadium in Tampa, Florida.
27 — Bell Biv DeVoe released their first album in sixteen years, Three Stripes.
Lauren Alaina released her first album in a little over five years, Road Less Traveled.

February
5 — Luke Bryan performed the National Anthem, and Lady Gaga performed during halftime at Super Bowl LI at NRG Stadium in Houston. Lady Gaga's halftime set garnered 117.5 million television viewers, becoming the second most-watched Super Bowl halftime show in history. 
6 — Jipsta released his third studio album, Ban2oozle, marking his return to the industry since recovering from the injuries sustained during a hate crime attack in March 2014.
12 — The 59th Annual Grammy Awards, hosted by James Corden, took place at the Staples Center in Los Angeles. Adele won the most awards of the night with five wins including Album of the Year for 25. This is the second time she has won Album of the Year after winning for her previous album in 2012, and is the second female to win the award more than once after Taylor Swift. She also won both Record of the Year and Song of the Year for "Hello". Adele ties Paul Simon for the most Grammys won in the general categories, with 7. Chance the Rapper becomes the first ever unsigned artist to win a Grammy. The awards he won are Best New Artist, Best Rap Performance, and Best Rap Album.
17 — Alison Krauss released her first solo studio album in seventeen and a half years, Windy City.

March
5 — The iHeartRadio Music Awards took place at The Forum in Inglewood, California.
10 — The Shins released their first album in five years, Heartworms.
Josh Turner released his first album in five years, Deep South.

April
2 — The 52nd Annual Academy of Country Music Awards took place at the T-Mobile Arena in Las Vegas.
7 — Michelle Branch released her first studio album in 14 years, Hopeless Romantic.
21 — Incubus released their first album in six years, 8.

May
5 — Blondie released their first album in six years, Pollinator.
 At the Drive-In released In•ter a•li•a, their first studio album in 17 years.
12 — Danzig released their first album in seven years, Black Laden Crown.
18 — Chris Cornell, frontman for Soundgarden and Audioslave, dies in Detroit after performing a concert with Soundgarden. It was found that he had hanged himself in his Detroit hotel room, at the age of 52. Fans and media outlets took notice of Cornell's choice of date and method and their direct parallels with the suicide of Joy Division frontman Ian Curtis exactly 37 years prior; Joy Division's music was popular among the members of Soundgarden.
21 — The Billboard Music Awards took place at the T-Mobile Arena in Las Vegas.
23 — Chris Blue won the twelfth season of The Voice. Lauren Duski was named runner-up. Aliyah Moulden and Jesse Larson finished third and fourth place respectively.

June
7 — The CMT Music Awards took place at the Music City Center in Nashville, Tennessee.
9 — Katy Perry released her first album in four years, Witness.
Glen Campbell released his final studio album and first in four years, Adios.
Chuck Berry's first studio album in 38 years (as well as his final album), Chuck, was released, less than 3 months after his death.
 23 - Imagine Dragons released their 3rd album (and their first album in 2 years), Evolve.
30 — Jay-Z released his first album in four years, 4:44.
TLC released their first album in fifteen years, TLC.

July
7 — Haim released their first album in four years, Something to Tell You.
15 — Dodger Stadium hosts the first night of the Classic West concert. This is the full first Eagles live performance after the death of January 2016 founding member Glenn Frey, his place has been taken by his son Deacon Frey and American Country artist Vince Gill with supporting acts The Doobie Brothers and Steely Dan.
16 — Dodger Stadium also hosts the second night of the Classic West concert with Earth, Wind & Fire, Journey, and Fleetwood Mac.
20 — Linkin Park and former Stone Temple Pilots and Dead by Sunrise frontman Chester Bennington is found dead at his Los Angeles home from hanging himself. He was 41. Parallels were tied to the suicide even more, on what would have been Chris Cornell's 53rd birthday.
 21 — Parmalee released their first album in four years, 27861.

August
4 — Randy Newman released his first studio new album in nine years, Dark Matter.
 Dan Wilson released his first solo album in ten years, Re-Covered. 
8 — Legendary country music singer, songwriter Glen Campbell died after suffering from Alzheimer's disease for six years.
11 — Kesha released her first album in five years, Rainbow.
25 — Taylor Swift released "Look What You Made Me Do", the lead single from her sixth studio album Reputation. The music video gained 43.2 million views in 24 hours, which broke the 24-hour Vevo record previously held by Adele.
27 — The MTV Video Music Awards took place at The Forum in Inglewood, California.

September
8 — Living Colour released their first album in eight years, Shade.
Jack Johnson released his first album in four years, All the Light Above It Too. 
Erin McCarley released her first album in five years, YUYĪ.
Troy Gentry of the country music duo Montgomery Gentry was killed in a helicopter crash hours before a concert in New Jersey. He was 50 years old.
22 — Fergie  released her first album in eleven years, Double Dutchess.
The Killers released their first album in five years, Wonderful Wonderful.

October
 1 — During Jason Aldean's set at the Route 91 Harvest music festival in Las Vegas, a gunman opens fire, killing 59 people and injuring 869 others.
 2 — Tom Petty dies of cardiac arrest at his home in Malibu, California at the age of 66.
 6 — L.A. Guns released their first album in five years, The Missing Piece.
 13 — Jessie James Decker released her first studio album in nine years, Southern Girl City Lights.
 P!nk released her first album in five years, Beautiful Trauma.

November
8 — The 51st CMA Awards took place at the Bridgestone Arena in Nashville. This marked the tenth year in a row that Brad Paisley and Carrie Underwood have co-hosted the show. 
10 — Taylor Swift released her sixth studio album Reputation. It went on to sell 1,238,000 units in the US, and 2,000,000 worldwide in its first week of release.
14 – Stone Temple Pilots hire former Dry Cell vocalist Jeff Gutt as their new official lead singer, replacing the late Chester Bennington after a two-year hiatus.
17 — Tim McGraw & Faith Hill released their first collaborative album, The Rest of Our Life. The album is Hill's first studio release in twelve years.
19 — The American Music Awards took place at the Microsoft Theater.

December
1 — Danielle Bradbery released her first album in four years, I Don't Believe We've Met.
 — Morbid Angel released their first album in six years, Kingdoms Disdained.
 — Glassjaw released Material Control, their first album in 15 years.
8 — Walker Hayes released his first album in six years, Boom.
19 — Chloe Kohanski won the thirteenth season of The Voice. Addison Agen was named runner-up. Brooke Simpson and Red Marlow finishing third and fourth place respectively.

Bands reformed
 The Ace of Cups
 As I Lay Dying
 Audioslave
 Company of Thieves
 Eagles
 Eighteen Visions
 House vs. Hurricane
 Iron Monkey
 Jawbreaker
 Light This City
 Madina Lake
 My American Heart
 Nachtmystium
 The Shaggs
 Sugarland
 Tripping Daisy
 Xscape

Bands formed
 Powerflo

Bands on hiatus
 Faith No More
 Sleepwave
 The Summer Set

Bands disbanded

Alex & Sierra
Audioslave
Bad Seed Rising
Chairlift
Cheap Girls
Cibo Matto
Cinderella
Coal Chamber
The Dillinger Escape Plan
Emblem3
Friendzone
Howler
Letlive
Linkin Park
Metro Station
Mindless Behavior
Mobb Deep
Montgomery Gentry
Poured Out
The Roches
A Skylit Drive
Spawn of Possession
Those Who Fear
Tom Petty and the Heartbreakers
Trap Them
A Tribe Called Quest
Vanna
William Control
Yellowcard
Your Memorial

Albums released in 2017

January

February

March

April

May

June

July

August

September

October

November

December

Top songs on record

Billboard Hot 100 No. 1 Songs
"Bad and Boujee" – Migos feat. Lil Uzi Vert 
"Black Beatles" – Rae Sremmurd feat. Gucci Mane 
"Bodak Yellow" – Cardi B 
"Despacito" – Luis Fonsi and Daddy Yankee feat. Justin Bieber 
"Humble" – Kendrick Lamar 
"I'm the One" – DJ Khaled feat. Justin Bieber, Quavo, Chance the Rapper and Lil Wayne 
"Look What You Made Me Do" – Taylor Swift 
"Perfect" – Ed Sheeran and Beyoncé 
"Rockstar" – Post Malone feat. 21 Savage 
"Shape of You" – Ed Sheeran 
"Starboy" – The Weeknd feat. Daft Punk 
"That's What I Like" – Bruno Mars

Billboard Hot 100 Top 20 Hits
All songs that reached the Top 20 on the Billboard Hot 100 chart during the year, complete with peak chart placement.

Deaths

January 6 – Sylvester Potts, 78, singer (The Contours)
January 8 – Buddy Bregman, 86, arranger, producer, and composer
January 9 – Crazy Toones, 45, hip-hop record producer and DJ (WC and the Maad Circle)
January 10 – Buddy Greco, 90, jazz and pop singer and actor
January 11 – Tommy Allsup, 85, rockabilly and swing musician
January 13 –
Dick Gautier, 85, actor and singer
Richie Ingui, 69, singer (Soul Survivors)
Alan Jabbour, 74, fiddler and folklorist
January 15 – Greg Trooper, 61, singer-songwriter
January 16 – 
Charles "Bobo" Shaw, 69, jazz drummer
Steve Wright, bassist (The Greg Kihn Band)
January 18 – Roberta Peters, 86, coloratura soprano
January 20 – 
Ronald "Bingo" Mundy, 76, singer (The Marcels)
Joey Powers, 82, singer-songwriter
Tommy Tate, 71, singer-songwriter
January 21 – 
Karl Hendricks, 46, singer-songwriter and guitarist (The Karl Hendricks Trio)
Walter "Junie" Morrison, 62, keyboardist (Ohio Players)
Maggie Roche, 65, singer-songwriter (The Roches)
January 23 – 
Bobby Freeman, 76, singer
Marvell Thomas, 75, keyboardist, record producer and arranger
January 24 –
Gil Ray, 60, drummer (Game Theory, The Loud Family)
Butch Trucks, 69, drummer (The Allman Brothers Band)
January 27 – Stan Boreson, 91, comedian, accordionist and singer
January 28 – Guitar Gable, 79, blues guitarist and singer
February 5
David Axelrod, 85, arranger, composer and record producer (The Electric Prunes)
Sonny Geraci, 70, singer (The Outsiders, Climax)
February 12
Barbara Carroll, 92, jazz pianist and singer
Robert Fisher, 59, singer (Willard Grant Conspiracy)
Al Jarreau, 76, singer
February 17 – Dave Yorko, 73, guitarist (Johnny and the Hurricanes)
February 18 – Clyde Stubblefield, 73, drummer
February 19 – Larry Coryell, 73, jazz guitarist
February 23 – Leon Ware, 77, singer-songwriter and record producer
February 28 – Ric Marlow, 91, songwriter and actor
March 3 – Jim Fuller, 69, guitarist (The Surfaris)
March 4
Valerie Carter, 64, singer-songwriter
Tommy Page, 46, singer-songwriter
March 6
Ritchie Adams, 78, songwriter and singer (The Fireflies)
Robbie Hoddinott, 62, guitarist (Kingfish)
March 8 – Dave Valentin, 64, jazz flutist
March 10 – Joni Sledge, 60, singer (Sister Sledge)
March 11 –
Evan Johns, 60, guitarist (The LeRoi Brothers)
Don Warden, 87, country musician and manager
March 12 –
Joey Alves, 63, guitarist (Y&T)
Robert "P-Nut" Johnson, 69, singer (Bootsy's Rubber Band, Sweat Band)
March 13 – Tommy LiPuma, 80, music producer
March 16 – James Cotton, 81, blues harmonica player
March 18 – Chuck Berry, 90, singer-songwriter and guitarist
March 20 –
 Tony Terran, 90, trumpeter, and session musician
 Buck Hill, 90, jazz saxophonist
March 22 – Sib Hashian, 67, drummer (Boston)
March 24 – Avo Uvezian, 91, Armenian-American jazz pianist, and cigar manufacturer
March 26 – Jimmy Dotson, 83, blues musician
March 27 – Arthur Blythe, 76, jazz alto saxophonist, and composer
March 28 – Terry Fischer, 70, singer (The Murmaids)
March 30 – Rosie Hamlin, 71, singer (Rosie and the Originals)
April 1 –
Lonnie Brooks, 83, blues singer and guitarist
Bob Cunningham, 82, jazz bassist
April 3 – Brenda Jones, 62, singer (The Jones Girls)
April 5 – Paul O'Neill, 61, producer, composer and songwriter (Trans-Siberian Orchestra)
April 6 – David Peel, 74, musician and political activist
April 8 – Keni Richards, 60, drummer (Autograph)
April 9 – Bob Wootton, 75, guitarist (The Tennessee Three)
April 10 –
Linda Hopkins, 92, actress and blues and gospel singer
Banner Thomas, 62, bassist (Molly Hatchet)
April 11 –
J. Geils, 71, guitarist (The J. Geils Band)
Scotty Miller, 65, drummer (Instant Funk)
April 12 –
Tom Coyne, 62, Grammy award-winning mastering engineer (21, 25)
Barry "Frosty" Smith, 71, drummer (Sweathog, Soulhat)
April 14 – Bruce Langhorne, 78, folk musician
April 15 –
Matt Holt, 39, singer (Nothingface)
Sylvia Moy, 78, songwriter
April 19 – Dick Contino, 87, accordionist
April 20 – Cuba Gooding Sr., 72, singer (The Main Ingredient)
May 2 – Kevin Garcia, 41, bassist (Grandaddy)
May 9 – Michael Parks, 77, actor and singer
May 10 – Pierre DeMudd, 64, trumpeter and singer (Dazz Band)
May 14 – Keith Mitchell, drummer (Mazzy Star)
May 17 – Chris Cornell, 52, singer-songwriter and musician (Soundgarden, Audioslave)
May 21
 Kenny Cordray, 62, guitarist and songwriter
 Jimmy LaFave, 61, folk singer-songwriter and guitarist
 Curtis Womack, 74, singer (The Valentinos)
May 22 – Mickey Roker, 84, jazz drummer
May 27 – Gregg Allman, 69, singer-songwriter and musician (The Allman Brothers Band)
May 29 – Arleen Lanzotti, 73, pop singer (The Delicates)
May 31 – Bern Nix, 69, jazz guitarist (worked with Ornette Coleman)
June 8 – Norro Wilson, 79, singer-songwriter and record producer
June 20
 Prodigy, 42, rapper (Mobb Deep)
 Bo Wagner, 72, marimba player (Starbuck)
June 22 – Jimmy Nalls, 66, guitarist (Sea Level)
June 28 – Gary DeCarlo, 75, singer-songwriter (Steam)
July 9 – Erik Cartwright, 66, guitarist (Foghat)
July 13 – Chris Wong Won, 53, rapper (2 Live Crew)
July 14 – David Zablidowsky, 38, bass guitarist 
July 20 – Chester Bennington, 41, singer, songwriter, musician (Linkin Park)
July 25 – Michael Johnson, 72, singer-songwriter
July 27 – Billy Joe Walker Jr., 64, record producer
July 28 – D.L. Menard, 85, Cajun singer
July 31 – Chuck Loeb, 61, drummer (Fourplay)
August 8 – Glen Campbell, 81, country singer, songwriter, actor
August 20 – Jerry Lewis, 91, actor and singer
August 21 – Sonny Burgess, 88, rockabilly singer
August 22 – John Abercrombie, 73, jazz guitarist
August 29 – Larry Elgart, 95, jazz bandleader and alto saxophonist
September 2 – Dave Hlubek, 66, guitarist (Molly Hatchet)
September 3 – Walter Becker, 67, jazz guitarist, songwriter, record producer (Steely Dan)
September 8 – 
Troy Gentry, 50, country singer (Montgomery Gentry)
Don Williams, 78, singer
September 13 – Grant Hart, 56, drummer and songwriter (Hüsker Dü)
September 22
Eric Eycke, 41 heavy metal singer (Corrosion of Conformity)
Ammon Tharp, 75, drummer (Bill Deal and the Rhondels)
September 23 – Charles Bradley, 68, soul singer
September 27 – CeDell Davis, 91, blues guitarist
September 30 – Tom Paley, 89, folk guitarist and banjoist
October 2 – Tom Petty, 66, rock singer and songwriter
October 4 – Janis Hansen, 74, singer (Sérgio Mendes & Brasil '66, The Carnival)
October 5 – Alvin DeGuzman, 42, hardcore guitarist
October 6 – Bunny Sigler, 76, singer songwriter and record producer
October 7 – Jimmy Beaumont, 76,  doo-wop singer (The Skyliners)
October 8 – Grady Tate, 85, jazz drummer and singer
October 22
Al Hurricane, 81, folk singer and songwriter 
Scott Putesky, 49, guitarist (Marilyn Manson)
October 24 
Fats Domino, 89, soul singer
Larry Raye, 63, guitarist
October 27 – 
Mike Hudson, 61, punk rock singer
Dick Noel, 90, big band singer
October 28 – Bruce Black, 56, heavy metal drummer (Meliah Rage)
October 29
Billy Mize, 88, steel guitarist, band leader and singer-songwriter
Keith Wilder, 65, funk singer (Heatwave)
November 1
Katie Lee, 98, folk singer
Scott Wily, singer
November 5
Danny Anaya, 52, heavy metal drummer (MX Machine)
Robert Knight, 72, singer-songwriter
November 9
Fred Cole, 69, garage singer and guitarist
Chuck Mosley, 57, singer-songwriter (Faith No More)
November 12 – Chad Hanks, 46, bassist (American Head Charge)
November 15 – Lil Peep, 21, Swedish-American rapper and singer
November 18 – Ben Riley, 84, jazz drummer
November 19
Warren "Pete" Moore, 79, singer-songwriter (The Miracles) 
Della Reese, 86, singer and actress
Mel Tillis, 85, country singer
November 21
David Cassidy, 67, singer and actor
Wayne Cochran, 78, singer-songwriter
November 22 – Tommy Keene, 59, singer-songwriter
November 23 – 
John Coates Jr., 79, jazz pianist
Jon Hendricks, 96, jazz singer
November 24 – Mitch Margo, 70, singer-songwriter (The Tokens)
November 27 – Robert Popwell, 66, jazz and rock bassist
November 29 – Robert Walker, 80, blues guitarist
November 30 – Jim Nabors, 87, actor and singer
December 2 – Mundell Lowe, 95, guitarist
December 8 – Gloria Ann Taylor, 73, soul singer
December 12 – Pat DiNizio, 62, singer-songwriter and guitarist (The Smithereens)
December 13
Dave Christenson, 54, singer (Stabilizers)
Willie Pickens, 86  jazz pianist
Warrel Dane, 56  heavy metal singer
December 16
Ralph Carney, 61 Rock and jazz saxophonist and clarinetest
Richard Dobson, 75  country singer and songwriter
Keely Smith, 89 Jazz Singer
December 17 – Kevin Mahogany, 59  jazz singer
December 19
Jim Forrester, 43 American hard rock guitarist
Leo Welch, 85 American gospel blues singer and guitarist
December 21
Roswell Rudd, 82 American jazz trombonist
Marylin Tyler, 91 American opera singer
December 22 – Pam the Funkstress, American hip hop DJ
December 28 – Curly Seckler, 98 American bluegrass guitarist and mandolinist

See also
2010s in music

References